Maksimilian Karlovich Maksakov (Максимилиа′н Ка′рлович Макса′ков, also known as Max Maksakov, real name Max Schwartz; 1869 in Chernivtsi, Duchy of Bukovina,  Austria-Hungary — March 26, 1936 in Moscow, USSR) — was an Austrian/Russian opera singer (dramatic baritone) and music teacher. As a theater director, entrepreneur and later Russian Academy of Theatre Arts professor, Maksakov has made a considerable impact on the development of performance arts in Russia, especially in the province. His best known protégé was a renowned Soviet mezzo-soprano Maria Maksakova Sr. whom he married in 1920.

References

External links
 

1869 births
Musicians from Chernivtsi
People from the Duchy of Bukovina
Russian operatic baritones
1936 deaths